Nikolay Alexeivich Tuchkov (16 April 1765 – 30 October 1812, Yaroslavl) was a Russian general of the Russo-Swedish War (1788–1790), the suppression of the Kościuszko Uprising and the opposition to the French invasion of Russia. He rose to the rank of lieutenant general and commander of an infantry corps.

Career
The brother of Pavel & Alexander Tuchkov, Nikolay first came to note as a Major General commanding a Brigade of Gortchakov's wing under Korsakov in Switzerland, 1799, serving at the Second Battle of Zurich 25–26 September. In 1806 he commanded the 5th Division of Buxhoeveden's 2nd Army under Mikhail Kamensky in Poland, and served at the Battle of Pultusk 26 December. In the January 1807 offensive he commanded three Divisions (5th, 7th & 8th), and the right wing at Eylau 7/8 February 1807, where his troops were the first to be engaged. He was made commander on the Narew front that summer. On 11 June he drove Claparède from Drenzewo & Borki, but was forced back by Andre Masséna on the 12th. After hearing news of the defeat at Friedland on the 27th he abandoned Ostrolenka & retreated on Tykoczin, and was subsequently replaced by Tolstoi before the Treaty of Tilsit.

In 1808 he commanded the 5th Division under Buxhowden in Finland, serving at Revolax, 27 April. Stationed at Kuopio, he was then halted by Sandels at Iidensalmi, 15 October.

Commanding 3 Divisions in Wallachia, he was sent south for operations against Turkey in late August 1811. In 1812 he commanded the 3rd Corps of Barclay de Tolly's 1st Army of the West. He fought at Smolensk 17 August, then with Württemberg defeated Michel Ney at Valutina Gora (Lubino) on the 19th. Stationed on the left flank at Borodino on 7 September, he was gravely wounded in the chest leading the Pavlov Grenadiers against Utitsa and died three weeks later.

References
 Petre, F. Loraine.  Napoleon's Campaign in Poland, 1806–1807. London: John Lane, 1907. OCLC: 504519385

1765 births
1812 deaths
Russian commanders of the Napoleonic Wars
Russian people of the Kościuszko Uprising
Russian military personnel of the Russo-Swedish War (1788–1790)
Russian military personnel of the Finnish War
Russian duellists